Vladimir Manolkov (born 8 December 1974) is a Bulgarian former football goalkeeper.

References

1974 births
Living people
Bulgarian footballers
First Professional Football League (Bulgaria) players
FC Lokomotiv 1929 Sofia players
PFC Spartak Pleven players
PFC Belasitsa Petrich players
Association football goalkeepers